A daydream is a fantasy that a person has while awake.

Daydream(s) or Day Dream(s) may also refer to:

Film
 Daydreams (1915 film), a Russian silent film directed by Yevgeni Bauer
 Day Dreams (1919 film), an American lost silent film directed by Clarence Badger
 Day Dreams (1922 film), an American film starring Buster Keaton
 Daydream (1964 film) a Japanese pink film directed by Tetsuji Takechi
 Daydream (1981 film) a Japanese pink film directed by Tetsuji Takechi

Music

Albums 
 Daydream (Aimer album), 2016
 Daydream (Karrin Allyson album), 1997
 Daydream (Katherine Jenkins album), 2011
 Daydream (The Lovin' Spoonful album) or the title song (see below), 1966
 Daydream (Mariah Carey album), 1995
 Daydream – Moorland, by Tangerine Dream, a soundtrack from the TV series Tatort, 1983
 Daydream (D-Crunch EP), 2021
 Daydream (Day6 EP), 2016
 Day Dreams (Doris Day album), 1955
 Day Dreams (June Christy album), 2012

Songs 
 "Day Dream", a jazz standard composed by Duke Ellington and Billy Strayhorn with lyrics by John Latouche, 1941
 "Daydream" (The Lovin' Spoonful song), 1966
 "Daydream" (Wallace Collection song), 1969; covered by the Gunter Kallmann Choir (1970) and others
 "Daydream", by Iz*One from Bloom*Iz, 2020
 "Daydream", by J-Hope from Hope World, 2018
 "Daydream", by John Denver from Rhymes & Reasons, 1969
 "Daydream", by Journey from Evolution, 1979
 "Daydream", by Judy and Mary, 1994
 "Day Dream", by Lisa Dal Bello from Lisa Dal Bello, 1977
 "Daydream", by Markus Schulz and Andy Moor, 2008
 "Daydream", by Mike Oldfield from Tr3s Lunas, 2002
 "Daydream", by Miranda Cosgrove from Sparks Fly, 2010
 "Day Dream", by NCT 127 from Neo Zone, 2020
 "Daydream", by Robin Trower from Twice Removed from Yesterday, 1973
 "Daydream", by the Smashing Pumpkins from Gish, 1991
 "Daydream", by Sweet from Funny How Sweet Co-Co Can Be, 1971
 "Daydream", by Tycho from Dive, 2011
 "Daydream", by Vinnie Moore from Mind's Eye, 1986

Other uses 
 The Day-Dream, an 1842 poem by Alfred, Lord Tennyson
 The Day Dream (painting), an 1880 painting by Dante Gabriel Rossetti
 "Day Dream" (2 Stupid Dogs), a 1994 television episode
 Ghost Talker's Daydream or simply Daydream, a shōnen manga by Saki Okuse and Sankichi Meguro
 Google Daydream, a discontinued virtual reality platform
 Daydreams, a screensaver system introduced in Android 4.2

See also 
 Daydreamer (disambiguation)
 Daydreaming (disambiguation)